Alda Neves da Graça do Espírito Santo (30 April 1926 – 9 March 2010), known as Alda do Espírito Santo or Alda Graça, was a poet from São Tomé and Príncipe working in the Portuguese language. She also served in the Santomean government after the country's independence.

Life and career
She was born in São Tomé e Príncipe, the former Portuguese territory off the coast of West Africa, to João Graça do Espírito Santo and Maria de Jesus Agostinho das Neves. The family was prominent in São Tomé city. After primary school, she attended secondary school in Portugal. In 1948 Alda da Graça began studying in Lisbon to become a primary school teacher.

While in Lisbon, Alda da Graça met students from other Portuguese colonies and joined a student association called the Casa dos Estudantes do Império. In 1951, she founded Centro de Estudos Africanos with other students interested in nationalism, including Mário Pinto de Andrade and Agostinho Neto of Angola, Noémia de Sousa and Marcelino dos Santos of Mozambique, and Amílcar Cabral of Guinea-Bissau.

Alda da Graça returned to São Tomé in January 1953. She worked as a teacher and continued to be active in nationalist circles. In December 1965 she was arrested and imprisoned for several months by the Portuguese authorities as a result of her identification with the African liberation movement.

Since 1975, when São Tomé and Príncipe achieved independence from Portugal, she held several high offices in the government, including as Minister of Education and Culture, Minister of Information and Culture, President of the National Assembly, and General Secretary of the National Union of Writers and Artists of São Tomé and Príncipe.

She was also the author of the lyrics to the national anthem, "Independência total". Her published work includes O Jorgal das Ilhas (1976) and O Nosso o Solo Sagrado de Terra (1978). Her poem "The Same Side of the Canoe" (translated by Kathleen Weaver) is included in such anthologies as The Penguin Book of Women Poets (1987) and Daughters of Africa (1992).

In 2006, she wrote a preface to Retalhes do massacre de Batepá, a book by Manuel Teles Neto Da Costa.

She died aged 83 in hospital in Luanda, Angola, on 10 March 2010, when five days of national mourning was declared by the government of São Tomé e Principe.

Works
 O Jornal das Ilhas (1976)
 O Nosso o Solo Sagrado de Terra (1978)
 Mataram o rio da minha cidade (2003)
 Cantos do solo sagrado (2006)
 O coral das ilhas (Coral of the Islands) (2006)
 Mensagens do solo sagrado (2006)
 Mensagens do canto do Ossobó  (Messages from the Songs of Ossobó) (2008)
 Tempo universal' (Universal Time) (2008)
 O relógio do tempo (The Clock of Time) (2008)

References

Further reading
Russell G. Hamilton, Voices from an Empire: a history of Afro-Portuguese literature, Minneapolis: University of Minnesota Press, 1975,  pp. 370–73} 
Mario de Andrade, La poésie africaine d'expression portugaise: anthologie; précédée de Évolution et tendances actuelles, Paris: P.J. Oswald, 1969, p. 65
Eugène Tavares, Littératures lusophones des archipels atlantiques: Açores, Madère, Cap-Vert, São Tomé e Príncipe, Paris: L'Harmattan, 2009, p. 294, 

External links
"Morreu Alda Graça do Espírito Santo", Alda Neves da Graça do Espírito Santo's obituary ,  Téla Nón'', 9 March 2010.

1926 births
2010 deaths
Presidents of the National Assembly (São Tomé and Príncipe)
National anthem writers
People from São Tomé
Government ministers of São Tomé and Príncipe
São Tomé and Príncipe women writers
São Tomé and Príncipe poets
São Tomé and Príncipe women poets
20th-century poets
21st-century poets
20th-century women writers
21st-century women writers
Women government ministers of São Tomé and Príncipe
20th-century women politicians
Women legislative speakers
20th-century São Tomé and Príncipe politicians